Nick Jr.  is a long programming block airing on Nickelodeon Greece. It airs two hours on weekdays and four hours on weekends.

Current Programming
Dora the Explorer
Dora and Friends: Into the City!
Go, Diego, Go!
Max & Ruby
Shimmer and Shine
PAW Patrol
Little Bear
Tinga Tinga Tales
Nouky and Friends
Bubble Guppies
Blaze and the Monster Machines
Rusty Rivets
Kiva Can Do
Nella the Princess Knight

See also
Nickelodeon (Greece)
MTV Music (Greece)
MTV Greece
MTV+

Television channels and stations established in 2010
Greek-language television stations
Television channels in Greece
Television channels in Cyprus
Mass media in Athens
Greece
2010 establishments in Greece
Television channel articles with incorrect naming style